Zilia is a commune in the Haute-Corse department of France on the island of Corsica.

Geography
The municipality is part of the canton of Calvi.

One road, the D 151, serves the village and links it directly to Calenzana and Montegrosso.

History
Zilia is known for both vineyards as well a mineral spring which was operated before 1914 and again recently. The water sells throughout the island under the name of Zilia bottled water, both flat and carbonated.

The village suffered a huge fire on the night of 31 June 2005 at Calenzana and destroyed 1500ha of vegetation including many old olive trees in Balagne.

Population

See also
Communes of the Haute-Corse department

References

Communes of Haute-Corse